The Hanbury Arms is a Grade II listed public house on Caerleon High Street, near Newport, Wales. The historical significance of the Hanbury Arms is that it is famous for being visited frequently by Alfred, Lord Tennyson in 1856, where he began writing Idylls of the King from the building, with its riverside views. Along with the famous Medieval tower, the town of Caerleon is mentioned many times in the poem.

Description 
The Hanbury Arms has survived many renovations and the building's thick stone walls and stone fireplace remain intact.

The slate roof also consists of local Welsh stone. The windows, which were reformed in the 19th century and the interior remains in its true Tudor style. The pub is formed from local rubbled stone, limewashed and decorated in 16th century style.

History 
Caerleon has historic origins as an Iron Age Silures hill fort. Upon the arrival of the Roman outposts across Britain, including at nearby Caerwent, the Isca Augusta fortress at Caerleon developed on the River Usk as an important route for goods and men into the country. The River Usk served both as the port of Newport and as a medieval port of Caerleon, situated four miles upriver.

The first known construction on the site is a Norman tower built around 1219, which stands to this day. Two theories exist explaining the uncertain rising of the Norman tower. One theory suggests that the tower was twinned with another tower on the opposite bank of the River Usk. Together they served as a chain tower allowing access to the upper river. Some historians claim it formed the outer bailey of the village.

In the 1600s, Caerleon's quay grew, similar to the earlier established Roman docks that are now buried, and the Hanbury Arms was established as a significant monument on the riverside.

The Hanbury Arms was initially a townhouse for the wealthy Morgan family, known as Tŷ Glyndŵr. The oldest parts of the building date back to 1219. It is listed both as a building, and a scheduled Ancient Monument in the region of Caerleon. The building dates to 1565 and was later used in the 17th century as a Magistrate's Court. At that time the tower, which was thought to be of Roman origin at the time, was used to house criminals.

Present era 
The Hanbury family became the owners of the building in the 1720s. It became a pub around the 1750s and adopted the Hanbury family's coat of arms. In the 19th and early 20th centuries, the pub brewed its own beer. The Hanbury Arms brewery merged with Eastern Valleys brewery of Pontnewynydd in 1910 before being taken over by Hancock's Brewery in 1914.

In 2001 it was purchased by SA Brain. The business operates until 11.30pm during weekends. It hosts regular live performances from local and international musicians, especially so during the yearly Caerleon Arts Festival each summer.

Gallery

References 

Music venues in Newport, Wales
Newport, Wales
Culture in Newport, Wales
Commercial buildings completed in the 16th century
Grade II listed pubs in Wales
Landmarks in Newport, Wales
Caerleon
History of Monmouthshire
History of Newport, Wales
Grade II listed buildings in Caerleon, Wales